The 2021 Swedish Golf Tour, titled as the 2021 MoreGolf Mastercard Tour for sponsorship reasons, was the 38th season of the Swedish Golf Tour.

The 2021 season initially consisted of 18 tournaments. Two tournaments, the Winter Series, planned to be played in Spain 18–28 February was cancelled due to the COVID-19 pandemic. The Gamle Fredrikstad Open was also planned to be played in Norway, from 25–27 May, but was also cancelled due to the same reason. 14 scheduled tournaments remained, to take place from May to October; two in Finland, one in Norway and 11 in Sweden.

Qualifying School for the 2021 SGT and NGL season took place 30 September – 1 October 2020 over 36 holes at Barsebäck Golf & Country Club, Stockholm Golf Club and Kungsbacka Golf Club simultaneously.

Schedule
The following table lists official events during the 2021 season.

Order of Merit
The Order of Merit was titled as the MoreGolf Mastercard Tour Ranking and was based on prize money won during the season, calculated using a points-based system.

See also
2021 Danish Golf Tour
2021 Swedish Golf Tour (women)

Notes

References

External links 
 Moregolf Mastercard Tour

2021
2021 in golf
2021 in Swedish sport
Sports events curtailed due to the COVID-19 pandemic